Annie Murdoch may refer to:
Annie Murdoch  Brown (1856–1945), wife of Patrick John Murdoch and grandmother of Rupert Murdoch
Mrs Annie Murdoch, 1927 painting of the above, by George Washington Lambert
Annie Murdoch, a character in 2000s Scottish soap opera River City

See also
Anna Murdoch, Scottish journalist and novelist, former wife of businessman Rupert Murdoch